The Bamana Empire (also Bambara Empire or Ségou Empire) was a large West African state based at Ségou, now in Mali.  This state was established after the fall of the Mali Empire and the Keita dynasty, as a smaller Bambara Empire founded by other Bambara families related to the Keita clan.  It was ruled by the Kulubali or Coulibaly dynasty established c. 1640 by Kaladian Coulibaly also known as Fa Sine or Biton-si-u. The empire existed as a centralized state from 1712 until the 1861 invasion of Toucouleur conqueror, El Hadj Umar Tall.

History

Coulibaly dynasty
In around 1640, Fa Sine became the third Faama (Mande word for King) of a small kingdom of Bambara people in the city of  Ségou in Mali.  Though he made many successful conquests of neighboring tribes and kingdoms, he failed to set up a significant administrative framework, and the new empire disintegrated following his death (c. 1660).

In the early 18th century, Mamari Kulubali (sometimes cited as Mamari Bitòn) settled in Ségou and joined an egalitarian youth organization known as a tòn.  Mamari soon reorganized the tòn as a personal army, assumed the title of bitòn, and set about subduing rival chiefs.  He established control over Ségou, making it the capital of a new Bamana Empire.

Fortifying the capital with Songhai techniques, Bitòn Kulubali built an army of several thousand men and a navy of war canoes to patrol the Niger. He then proceeded to launch successful assaults against his neighbors, the Fulani, the Soninke, and the Mossi. He also attacked Tomboctou, though he held the city only briefly. During this time he founded the city of Bla as an outpost and armory.

Mamari Coulubali was the last ruler to be called Bitòn.  All future rulers were simply titled Faama. Bakari, the first Faama after Mamari reigned from (1710–1711).  Faama De-Koro ascended in 1712 reigning until 1736.  The kingdom had three more faamas with unstable 4-year reigns until falling into anarchy in 1748.

The Ngolosi
In 1750, a freed slave named Ngolo Diarra seized the throne and re-established stability, reigning for nearly forty years of relative prosperity.  The Ngolosi, his descendants, would continue to rule the Empire until its fall.  Ngolo's son Mansong Diarra took the throne following his father's 1795 death and began a series of successful conquests, including that of Timbuktu (c. 1800) and the Macina region.

Jihad and fall
At the Battle of Noukouma in 1818, Bambara forces met and were defeated by Fula Muslim fighters rallied by the jihad of Cheikou Amadu (or Seku Amadu) of Massina.  The Bamana Empire survived but was irreversibly weakened. Seku Amadu's forces decisively defeated the Bambara, taking Djenné and much of the territory around Mopti and forming into a Massina Empire. Timbuktu would fall as well in 1845.

The end of the weakened empire came at the hands of El Hadj Umar Tall, a Toucouleur conqueror who swept across West Africa from Dinguiraye. Umar Tall's mujahideen readily defeated the Bambara, seizing Ségou itself on March 10, 1861, and declaring an end to the Bamana Empire (which effectively became part of the Toucouleur Empire).

Economy and structure
The Bamana Empire was structured around traditional Bambara institutions, including the kòmò, a body to resolve theological concerns.  The kòmò often consulted religious sculptures in their decisions, particularly the four state boliw, large altars designed to aid the acquisition of political power.

The economy of the Bamana Empire flourished through trade, especially that of the slaves captured in their many wars.  The demand for slaves then led to further fighting, leaving the Bambara in a perpetual state of war with their neighbors.

Mungo Park, passing through the Bambara capital of Ségou two years after Diarra's 1795 death, recorded a testament to the Empire's prosperity:

See also
 Bambara language: a Mande language, spoken by 6 million people in Mali.
 Bambara people: an ethnic group who represent 40% of Mali's population.
 Kaarta, another Bambara kingdom of the same epoch

References

Further reading

External links
Segu Kingdom rulers, from Host Kingdoms
Mali traditional states from World Statesman
Epics about the Segou Kingdom

 
States and territories established in the 1640s
1640s establishments in Africa
1712 establishments in Africa
1861 disestablishments in Africa
Sahelian kingdoms
Former empires